Kurt Rosenwinkel (born October 28, 1970) is an American jazz guitarist, keyboardist, composer, bandleader, producer, educator and record label owner.

Biography
A native of Philadelphia, Rosenwinkel attended the Philadelphia High School for the Creative and Performing Arts. He studied at Berklee College of Music for two and a half years before leaving in his third year to tour with Gary Burton, the dean of the school at the time. After moving to Brooklyn, he began performing with Human Feel, Paul Motian's Electric Bebop Band, Joe Henderson, and the Brian Blade Fellowship.

In 1995 he won the Composer's Award from the National Endowment for the Arts and was signed by Verve. Since then, he has played and recorded as a leader and sideman with Mark Turner, Brad Mehldau, Joel Frahm, and Brian Blade. He collaborated with Q-Tip, who co-produced his studio album Heartcore that includes bassist Ben Street, drummer Jeff Ballard, and saxophonist Mark Turner. He played guitar on Q-Tip's albums The Renaissance and Kamaal/The Abstract.

In 2008 The Remedy was released, recorded with saxophonist Mark Turner, pianist Aaron Goldberg, bassist Joe Martin, and drummer Eric Harland. On November 10, 2009, he released a trio recording, Standards Trio: Reflections, with bassist Eric Revis and drummer Eric Harland. On September 7, 2010, he released Kurt Rosenwinkel & OJM: Our Secret World and with OJM an 18-piece big band from Porto, Portugal. His album Star of Jupiter was recorded with pianist Aaron Parks, bassist Eric Revis, and drummer Justin Faulkner. He is on the faculty at the Hochschule für Musik Hanns Eisler.

In 2016, Rosenwinkel formed the independent music label Heartcore Records and began producing as well as performing. He self-produced his eleventh album, 2017's Caipi, and was involved as a producer and guitarist on Brazilian multi-instrumentalist Pedro Martin’s 2019 release Vox.

Style
Rosenwinkel's influences include John Coltrane, Bud Powell, David Bowie, Joe Henderson, Charlie Parker, Keith Jarrett, Pat Metheny, Allan Holdsworth, Tal Farlow, George Van Eps, Bill Frisell, John Scofield, Alex Lifeson, and Skylee Jeffrey.

The Jazz Book calls Rosenwinkel "a visionary composer, with an infinitely sensitive way of layering electronic sounds, borrowed from ambient music, dub, and drum and bass, and manipulating them intelligently."

Equipment
Rosenwinkel has played a D'Angelico New Yorker, a Sadowsky semi-hollow body, a Gibson ES-335, guitars made by Italian luthier Domenico Moffa, and a signature model made by Westville Guitars.

Rosenwinkel has used a variety of effects, including: Neunaber WET Stereo Reverb, Strymon Timeline, Strymon Mobius, Strymon Blue Sky Reverb, Strymon El Capistan dTape Echo, Digitech Vocalist, Thegigrig HumDinger, Rockett Allan Holdsworth, Empress ParaEQ, Pro Co RAT distortion, TC Electronic Nova Reverb, Lehle D. Loop Effect-loop/Switcher, Malekko Echo 600 Dark, Old World Audio 1960 Compressor, Electro-Harmonix HOG Polyphonic Guitar Synthesizer, Eventide TimeFactor Delay, Xotic X-Blender Effects Loops, Empress Tremolo, Lehle Parallel line mixer, TC Electronic SCF stereo chorus flanger, and Boss Corporation OC-3 octave, Strymon Riverside, Eventide H9, EHX Pog 2, Source Audio EQ, among others. He has also used a Lavalier lapel microphone fed into his guitar amplifier that blends his vocalizing with his guitar.

Discography

As leader/co-leader 
 1992: Do It 1992 with Scott Kinsey (Heartcore, 2019)[limited edition]
 1996: East Coast Love Affair (Fresh Sound, 1996) – live
 1996: The Enemies of Energy (Verve, 2000)
 1998: Intuit (Criss Cross, 1999)
 2000: The Next Step (Verve, 2001)
 2001–03: Heartcore (Verve, 2003)
 2005?: Deep Song (Verve, 2005)
 2006: The Remedy (ArtistShare, 2008)[2CD] – live
 2009: Reflections (Wommusic, 2009)
 2009: Our Secret World (Wommusic, 2010)
 2012: Star of Jupiter (Wommusic, 2012)[2CD]
 2007–17: Caipi (Razdaz, 2017)
 2017–18: Bandit 65: Searching the Continuum (Heartcore, 2019) – live
 2020?: Angels Around (Heartcore, 2020)
 2020: Plays Piano  (Heartcore, 2021)
 2021?: Heartcore (Heartcore, 2021)[2LP]
 2021–22: The Chopin Project with Jean-Paul Brodbeck (Heartcore, 2022)

As group 
Human Feel
With Chris Speed, Andrew D'Angelo and Jim Black
 1991: Scatter (GM, 1991)
 1994: Welcome to Malpesta (New World, 1994)
 1996?: Speak to It (Songlines, 1996)
 2006: Galore (Skirl, 2007)
 2017: Gold (Intakt, 2019)

Collaborations 
With Roman Ott Inner Shape
 Seeing People (Fresh Sound New Talent, 2009) – recorded in 2008

With Orchestra de Jazz de Matoshinhos (OJM)
 Our Secret World (Wommusic, 2010) – recorded in 2009

As sideman 

With Brian Blade
 Perceptual (Blue Note, 2000) – recorded in 1999
 Season of Changes (Verve, 2008)
 Mama Rosa (Verve Forecast, 2009)

With Seamus Blake
 The Call (Criss Cross, 1994) – recorded in 1993
 Stranger Things Have Happened (Fresh Sound, 1999)

With Chris Cheek
 I Wish I Knew (Fresh Sound, 1997)
 Vine (Fresh Sound, 2000)With Aaron Goldberg Worlds (Sunnyside, 2006)
 The Now (Sunnyside, 2014)With Rebecca Martin Middlehope (Fresh Sound, 2001)
 The Growing Season (Sunnyside, 2008)With Barney McAll Release the Day (Transparent Music, 2000)
 Mother of Dreams and Secrets (Research, 2018)With Paul Motian 1992: Paul Motian and the Electric Bebop Band (JMT, 1993)
 1994: Reincarnation of a Love Bird (JMT, 1994)
 1996: Flight of the Blue Jay (Winter & Winter, 1997)
 1998: Play Monk and Powell (Winter & Winter, 1999)With Q-Tip 2001: Kamaal the Abstract (Jive, 2009)
 2003–08: The Renaissance (Universal Motown, 2008)With Mark Turner 1994: Yam Yam (Criss Cross, 1995)
 1998: In This World (Warner Bros., 1998)
 1999: Ballad Session (Warner Bros., 2000)
 2001: Dharma Days (Warner Bros., 2001)With others' Nicola Andrioli, Skylight (Heartcore, 2022)
 Alain Apaloo, Nunya (Gateway Music, 2015)
 Gary Burton, Six Pack (GRP, 1992)
 Jo-Yu Chen, Stranger (Okeh, 2014)
 Joe Claussell, Language (Ibadan, 1999)
 Louis Cole, Quality Over Opinion (Brainfeeder, 2022)
 George Colligan, Unresolved (Fresh Sound, 1999)
 Kyle Crane, Crane Like the Bird (Self-released, 2019)
 Eli Degibri, In the Beginning (Fresh Sound, 2003)
 Riccardo Del Fra, Moving People (Parco Della Musica 2018)
 Domi and JD Beck, NOT TiGHT (Blue Note, 2022)
 Orrin Evans, #knowingishalfthebattle (Smoke Sessions, 2016)
 Donald Fagen, Sunken Condos (Reprise, 2012)
 Joel Frahm, Live at Smalls (SmallsLIVE, 2011) – live
 Larry Goldings, Big Stuff (Warner Bros., 1996)
 Tim Hagans, Animation Imagination (Blue Note, 1999)
 Nitai Hershkovits, I Asked You a Question (Raw Tapes/Time Grove, 2016)
 Jason Lindner, Gives You Now vs Now (Anzic, 2009)
 Matthias Lupri, Same Time Twice (Summit, 2002)
 Tobias Meinhart, Berlin People (Sunnyside, 2019)
 Marcy Playground, Shapeshifter (Capitol, 1999)
 Charlie Peacock, Love Press Ex-Curio (Runway, 2005)
 Danilo Perez, Motherland (Verve, 2002)
 Chris Potter, Vertigo (Concord Jazz, 1998)
 Joshua Redman, Momentum (Nonesuch, 2005)
 Jochen Rueckert, Introduction (Jazzline, 1998)
 Perico Sambeat, Friendship (ACT, 2003)
 Daniel Szabo, Frictions (Pid, 2007)
 Toku, Everything She Said (SME, 2000)
 Olivia Trummer, Fly Now (Contemplate Music, 2014)
 Wax Poetic, Three'' (Doublemoon, 1998)

References

External links
 Official site
 State of Mind - Conversation with Kurt Rosenwinkel - 2008
 Kurt Rosenwinkel articles on NPR Music
 Jazzfuel - Interview with Kurt Rosenwinkel - 2017

1970 births
Living people
20th-century American guitarists
21st-century American guitarists
Avant-garde jazz musicians
American jazz guitarists
Berklee College of Music alumni
Verve Records artists
Criss Cross Jazz artists
Guitarists from Philadelphia
Jazz musicians from Pennsylvania
Human Feel members
Philadelphia High School for the Creative and Performing Arts alumni
ArtistShare artists